Dąbek may refer to the following places:
Dąbek, Kuyavian-Pomeranian Voivodeship (north-central Poland)
Dąbek, Mława County in Masovian Voivodeship (east-central Poland)
Dąbek, Gmina Czerwin in Masovian Voivodeship (east-central Poland)
Dąbek, Gmina Troszyn in Masovian Voivodeship (east-central Poland)
Dąbek, Silesian Voivodeship (south Poland)
Dąbek is also a surname. Notable people with the surname include:
 Stanisław Dąbek